Marcello Figolino (born c. 1430) was an Italian painter of the Renaissance period, active mainly in his natal city of Vicenza, where he painted an Adoration of the Magi for San Bartolomeo, and a Madonna and child with saints for San Francesco. He also painted an altarpiece for San Tomasso.

Sources

1430s births
People from Vicenza
15th-century Italian painters
Italian male painters
Painters from Vicenza
Italian Renaissance painters
Year of death unknown